The 2022–23 Jacksonville State Gamecocks men's basketball team represented Jacksonville State University in the 2022–23 NCAA Division I men's basketball season. The Gamecocks, led by seventh-year head coach Ray Harper, played home games at the Pete Mathews Coliseum in Jacksonville, Alabama as second-year members (in their second stint) of the ASUN Conference. They finished the season 13–18, 6–12 to finish in a tie for 11th place. They failed to qualify for the ASUN tournament.

Previous season
The Gamecocks finished the 2021–22 season 21–11, 13–3 in ASUN play to finish in first place in the West division. As the No. 1 seed in the ASUN tournament, the Gamecocks defeated Kennesaw State in the quarterfinals before losing in the semifinals to Jacksonville. However, because the eventual tournament champion, Bellarmine, was ineligible for the NCAA tournament due to their transition to Division I, Jacksonville State received the conference's automatic bid to the NCAA tournament as the No. 15 seed in the Midwest region. They lost in the first round of the tournament to Auburn.

Roster

Schedule and results 

|-
!colspan=12 style=| Exhibition

|-
!colspan=12 style=| Non-conference regular season

|-
!colspan=13 style=| ASUN Conference regular season

|-

Sources

References

Jacksonville State Gamecocks men's basketball seasons
Jacksonville State Gamecocks
Jacksonville State Gamecocks men's basketball
Jacksonville State Gamecocks men's basketball